The HTC HD Mini is a smartphone running the Windows Mobile operating system with HTC Sense. The phone was designed and manufactured by HTC, and was first released in February 2010.

Description
With a screen size of 81.2 mm (3.2") and weighing 3.88 ounces (110 grams) with battery, it is a compact version of its larger sibling, the HTC HD2, although being powered by a lower speed 600 MHz Qualcomm processor and a 512 MB ROM/384 MB RAM storage combination. Other features include multi-touch display, 5 megapixel color camera with auto focus; internal GPS antenna; 3G broadband connectivity, Wi-Fi and FM radio. As compared to the HD2's WVGA resolution, the HD Mini has HVGA, in tandem with the smaller screen.

The HTC HD mini includes capacitive touch for viewing, zooming and resizing websites, Microsoft Office files, PDF documents and pictures.

Unlike the HD2, the HD Mini natively runs Windows Mobile 6.5.3, as compared to 6.5.1 native on the HD2 (although developers have cooked 6.5.3 and 6.5.5 ROMs for the HD2).

See also
HTC Touch Family
HTC Touch HD
HTC HD2 – the original phone on which the HD Mini is based on
HTC HD7 – the successor to the HD2

References

HTC HD Mini – GSMArena.com

HD Mini
Windows Mobile Professional devices
Mobile phones with user-replaceable battery